{{Infobox film
| name           = The Weakness of Strength(aka:The Evil That Men Do)
| image          = The Weakness of Strength.jpg
| caption        = Advertisement
| director       = Harry Revier
| producer       = 
| writer         = Wallace CliftonAaron Hoffman
| starring       = Edmund Breese
| music          =
| cinematography = Joseph Seiden
| editing        = 
| distributor    = Metro Pictures
| released       = 
| runtime        = 50 minutes
| country        = United States
| language       = Silent (English intertitles)
}}The Weakness of Strength''''' is a 1916 American silent drama film directed by Harry Revier. It is considered to be a lost film.

Cast
 Edmund Breese as Daniel Gaynor
 Clifford Bruce as Bill Jackson
 Ormi Hawley as Mary Alden
 Evelyn Brent as Bessie Alden
 Florence Moore as Little Bessie
 Clifford Grey as Richard Grant (as Clifford B. Gray)

See also
List of lost films

References

External links

1916 films
1916 drama films
1916 lost films
Silent American drama films
American silent feature films
American black-and-white films
Films directed by Harry Revier
Lost American films
Metro Pictures films
Lost drama films
1910s American films